Bible bee may refer to:

National Bible Bee
Any organization that sponsors a Bible quiz